Durrett-Jarratt House, also known as the Isaac Jarratt House, is historic plantation house located near Enon, Yadkin County, North Carolina.  It was built about 1820, and is a large, two-story, four bay, Federal style frame dwelling.  It rests on a brick foundation, has molded weatherboard siding, a gable roof and exterior brick end chimneys.  It has a mid-19th century shed roofed front porch, and dining room and kitchen additions.  Also on the property is a contributing commissary building.  The interior features original wood graining and decorative painting.

It was listed on the National Register of Historic Places in 1997.

References

Plantation houses in North Carolina
Houses on the National Register of Historic Places in North Carolina
Federal architecture in North Carolina
Houses completed in 1820
Houses in Yadkin County, North Carolina
National Register of Historic Places in Yadkin County, North Carolina